Stryn is a municipality in the county of Vestland, Norway. It is located in the traditional district of Nordfjord. The administrative center of the municipality is the village of Stryn. The municipality is located along the innermost part of the Nordfjorden. Some of the main villages in Stryn include Loen, Innvik, Utvik, Randabygda, Olden, and Flo.

Farming, forestry, fruit growing, animal breeding for furs, small manufacturing industries, tourism, and the service trades provide the main occupations. The wide river Stryneelva enters the village of Stryn from the east after meandering through the fertile Stryn Valley, from the large lake Oppstrynsvatn. The Jostedalsbreen National Park Centre is situated on the shore of this lake.

Stryn is known for its all year glacier skiing at Stryn Sommerski. It is also the home of the footballer-brothers Tore André Flo, Jarle Flo and Jostein Flo, who grew up in the village of Stryn, as well as their footballing-cousin Håvard Flo who is from the village of Flo.

The  municipality is the 67th largest by area out of the 356 municipalities in Norway. Stryn is the 138th most populous municipality in Norway with a population of 7,207.

General information
Innvik was established as a municipality on 1 January 1838 (see formannskapsdistrikt law). The original municipality was identical to the Innvik parish (prestegjeld) with the sub-parishes of Oppstryn, Nedstryn, Loen, Olden, Innvik, and Utvik. In 1843, the sub-parishes of Loen, Oppstryn, and Nedstryn were separated from the municipality of Innvik and became a separate municipality named Stryn. The population of Stryn at this time was 2,401. On 10 January 1922, the area of Raksgrenda was transferred from Innvik to Stryn. The population in this area was 120 at that time.

During the 1960s, there were many municipal mergers across Norway due to the work of the Schei Committee. On 1 January 1965, a merger took place combining the following areas into a new Stryn municipality:
the municipality of Innvik (population: 3,003)
the municipality of Stryn (population: 2,982)
the parts of Hornindal Municipality located east of the villages of Navelsaker and Holmøyvik (population: 1,184)
the Hoplandsgrenda area in the municipality of Gloppen (population: 42)
Initially, this new municipality of Stryn had a population of 7,211.

On 1 January 1977, the parts of the old Hornindal Municipality that were merged with Stryn in 1965 were transferred back to the newly re-constituted Hornindal municipality. The population of Stryn was reduced by 1,202 in this transaction.

On 1 January 2019, the Maurset area in the southern part of the neighboring municipality of Hornindal (population: 19) was transferred from Hornindal to Stryn.

On 1 January 2020, the municipality became part of the newly created Vestland county after Sogn og Fjordane and Hordaland counties were merged.

Name
The name originally (probably) belonged to the river of Stryneelva. The name is derived from strjónn which means "(strong) stream".

Coat of arms
The coat of arms was granted on 11 December 1987. The arms are green with a gold-colored linden (tilia) branch with four leaves. The linden was chosen to represent the vast deciduous forests in the region and the four leaves were chosen to represent the four main village areas along the fjord.

Churches
The Church of Norway has eight parishes within the municipality of Stryn. It is part of the Nordfjord prosti (deanery) in the Diocese of Bjørgvin.

Government
All municipalities in Norway, including Stryn, are responsible for primary education (through 10th grade), outpatient health services, senior citizen services, unemployment and other social services, zoning, economic development, and municipal roads. The municipality is governed by a municipal council of elected representatives, which in turn elect a mayor.  The municipality falls under the Sogn og Fjordane District Court and the Gulating Court of Appeal.

Municipal council
The municipal council  of Stryn is made up of 25 representatives that are elected to four year terms. The party breakdown of the council is as follows:

Mayor
The mayor  of a municipality in Norway is a representative of the majority party of the municipal council who is elected to lead the council. The mayors of Stryn (incomplete list):
2019–present: Per Kjøllesdal (Sp)
2011-2019: Sven Flo (H)
1999-2011: Nils Petter Støyva (Ap)
1992-1999: Oddvin Drageset (Sp)

Geography

Location
Stryn is located on the northern border of Vestland county. To the north, Stryn is bordered by the municicaplities of Volda and Stranda (in Møre og Romsdal county), to the east is Skjåk (in Innlandet county), to the southeast is Luster, to the southwest is Sunnfjord, and to the west is Gloppen and Stad.

Nature
Stryn is known for its scenery, glaciers and the mountains running into the mirroring fjords and lakes. The glacier Briksdalsbreen lies in the Oldedalen valley. The Stryn area also has a number of other valley glaciers including Tindefjellbreen, Tystigsbreen, and Myklebustbreen. Most of the valley glaciers in Stryn are originating from the great Jostedal glacier (Jostedalsbreen) between the Nordfjord and Sogn areas.

Ramnefjellsfossen, the third highest free-falling waterfall in the world, is located in the municipality. Stryn also has the largest linden forest in Northern Europe. The largest lakes are Oppstrynsvatn, Lovatnet, and Oldevatnet. The mountains Skåla, Lodalskåpa, and Høgstre Breakulen are all located in Stryn.

Jostedal Glacier National Park
Flora and fauna area is situated between the fjord and glacier. The museum Jostedalsbreen nasjonalparksenter is located in Oppstryn.

Briksdal glacier
Visitors from all over the world come to see the Briksdalsbreen glacier outlet, which is situated amid waterfalls and high peaks. Briksdal glacier is a part of the Jostedal glacier ice field, which is the largest glacier on the European mainland. It is located at the end of the Oldedalen valley.

Lodalen–Kjenndalen
On two occasions, large rockslides from Ramnefjellet hit the lake below. The resulting flood wave wiped out the settlements of Nesdal and Bødal, killing 135 people.

Wildlife
There are many bird species in this area including the golden eagle (Aquila chrysaetos), rough-legged buzzard (Buteo lagopus), and the white-backed woodpecker (Dendrocopus leucotos). Some of the larger mammals that live in this region are red deer (Cervus elaphus), wolverines (Gulo gulo), and lynxes (Lynx lynx).

National Tourist Route
The Gamle Strynefjellsvegen is a National Tourist Route (Fylkesvei 258). It goes from Grotli (Skjåk municipality in Innlandet county) to Videseter, where a waterfall is, and on to the village of Stryn (Vestland county).

Attractions

Stryn Center
The village of Stryn, a busy and developing small village at the tip of the most northernly of the three short branches at the inner end of Nordfjorden, is the local government and shopping centre for a large community and the junction of roads which connect inner Nordfjord with the rest of Norway.

Oldedalen Valley

Olden has two churches. The Old Olden Church in the village, was built in 1759 on the site of a Stave church dating from around 1300. Its pews, doors, and jambs are made from timbers of the Stave church. The "new" Olden Church, a short distance along the valley, was built in 1934 so that the old church could be preserved.

Loen and Lodalen Valley
The Loen Skylift is located in Loen, and Hotel Alexandra is a popular tourist retreat. Loen Valley (Lodalen) is a popular attraction, and Kjenndal Glacier is located at the end of the valley (branch of the Jostedal Glacier). Much of the upper Loen valley was devastated from two rockfall slides (one in 1905 and one in 1936) that created huge waves that swept with them most of the houses and vegetation. A total of 135 people were killed in these two incidents.

Innvik and Utvik
On the southern shore of the Nordfjorden, between Hildaneset and Utvikfjellet, lie the villages of Innvik and Utvik, in the area known as Vikane. The main road (Rv 60) skirts the fjord past Innvik and ascends from Utvik to Utvikfjellet mountain. At Hildaneset, beside the main road, there is a sculpture of Mr. Singer. Mr Singer financed the building of the road.

Skiing
Stryn Sommerski is one of Norway's best known skiing facilities. It offers excellent skiing conditions in the summer, with lifts and tracks for all types of skiing, including Cross-country skiing, Alpine skiing, Telemark skiing, and snowboarding.

Notable people 

 Alf Torp (1853 in Stryn – 1916) a Norwegian philologist and author
 Jacob Aaland (1865 in Randabygda – 1950) a teacher, local historian, and government scholar
 Thoralf Klouman (1890 in Innvik – 1940) a Norwegian satirical illustrator and actor 
 Johannes Andenæs (1912 in Innvik – 2003) a distinguished Norwegian jurist and academic
 Inge Fænn (born 1945 in Markane) a Norwegian editor, journalist and author

Sport 
 Per Knut Aaland (born 1954 in Randabygda) a retired cross-country skier, team silver medallist at the 1980 Winter Olympics
 brothers Kjell Rune Flo (born 1961), Jostein Flo (born 1964), Jarle Flo (born 1970), Tore André Flo (born 1973) and cousins Håvard Flo (born 1970), Per-Egil Flo (born 1989) and nephew Ulrik Flo (born 1988) are footballers from Flo & Stryn
 Mats Solheim (born 1987 in Loen) a Norwegian footballer with over 320 club caps
 Johannes Thingnes Bø (born 1993 in Stryn) a biathlete, gold medallist and twice team silver medallist at the 2018 Winter Olympics

References

External links

Municipal fact sheet from Statistics Norway 
Official Website of Stryn 
Official travel guide to Stryn
Stryn summer skiing
NRK: Stryn Kommune 
Gamle Strynefjellsvegen

 
Municipalities of Vestland
1843 establishments in Norway
Ski areas and resorts in Norway